Dixon Peak, previously known as Mount Dixon, is the 23rd highest peak in New Zealand, rising to a height of . It is located in the Southern Alps of the South Island in the Mackenzie District, within Aoraki / Mount Cook National Park, and only a short distance from its more illustrious neighbour Aoraki / Mount Cook. The mountain is a popular peak for climbers, and is used as a practice run for ascents of Cook.

Mount Dixon was named by Noel Brodrick for the mountaineer, Marmaduke Dixon (1862–1918).

NOTE: The mountain should not be confused with Mount Dixon (North Canterbury), a lower peak of the same name close to the valley of the Hurunui River in North Canterbury,  to the north east.

See also
 List of mountains of New Zealand by height

References

Southern Alps
Mountains of Canterbury, New Zealand